A list of films produced in the United Kingdom in 1979 (see 1979 in film):

1979

See also
1979 in British music
1979 in British radio
1979 in British television
1979 in the United Kingdom

External links

1979
Films
British